Scott Fischman (born 1980 in Langhorne, Pennsylvania) is an American professional poker player based in Las Vegas, Nevada.

Poker career
Fischman grew up in South Jersey and moved to Las Vegas at the age of 12. He was introduced to poker by a school friend and went on to become a poker dealer at the Sahara and The Mirage. At the 2004 World Series of Poker (WSOP), he became the youngest person ever to win two WSOP bracelets, winning one bracelet in a no limit Texas hold'em and a second in a H.O.R.S.E. tournament.

In 2003, Fischman became a member of the poker-playing group "The Crew," which also included Dutch Boyd, Bobby Boyd, David Smyth, Joe Bartholdi Jr, Tony Lazar, and Brett Jungblut (Jungblut and Bartholdi have both since left the group).

In 2004, Fischman defeated Joe Cassidy to win the World Poker Tour (WPT) Young Guns of Poker invitational event.  In 2005 he finished 2nd to Allen Cunningham in the WSOP $1,500 no-limit hold'em event.

In 2008, Fischman made the final table in the Main Event at the World Series of Poker Europe, finishing in 6th place.

Fischman has competed in and served as a guest commentator for the Ultimate Poker Challenge. As "emptyseat88", he plays on numerous online poker cardrooms.

As of 2010, his total live tournament winnings exceed $2,600,000. His 11 cashes at the WSOP account for $1,121,419 of those winnings.

Bibliography
Online Ace: A World Series of Poker Champion's Guide to Mastering Internet Poker (2006)

References

External links

 World Poker Tour profile
 CardPlayer Magazine feature
 PokerLizard.com interview
 BarstoolSports interview
 Pokulator 10 Questions Interview

American gambling writers
American male non-fiction writers
American poker players
American people of German descent
People from Langhorne, Pennsylvania
World Poker Tour winners
World Series of Poker bracelet winners
1981 births
Living people